Shahrak-e Shahid Moḩammad-e Borujerdi (also Romanized as Shahrak-e Shahīd Moḩammad-e Borūjerdī; also known as Darreh Gerg (Persian: دره گرگ)) is a village in Oshtorinan Rural District, Oshtorinan District, Borujerd County, Lorestan Province, Iran. At the 2006 census, its population was 1,543, in 424 families.

References 

Towns and villages in Borujerd County